Abbas Aram (1906–1985) was an Iranian diplomat and served as foreign minister for two terms between 1959 and 1960 and between 1962 and 1966. In addition, he was the ambassador of Iran to various countries, including Iraq, the United Kingdom and China.

Career
Aram was the first secretary at the embassy of Iran in the United States in the 1940s. As of 1950 he was serving as the chargé d'affaires there. He was the Iranian ambassador to Japan and then, to Iraq during the reign of Shah Mohammad Reza Pahlavi. 

Aram served as foreign minister in the late 1950s and 1960s. More specifically, he was twice appointed foreign minister. His first term was brief, from 1959 to 1960. He was appointed to the post for a second term on 19 July 1962. On 30 April and 1 May 1963 he represented Iran at the eleventh session of CENTO ministerial council in Karachi, Pakistan. Another significant event during his second term as minister of foreign affairs was the Iran–Soviet Memorandum concerning the sovereign rights of two countries in the Caspian Sea. This agreement is known as Aram-Pegov agreement (Pegov refers to Nikolai Pegov, Soviet signatory of the document and ambassador to Iran), and was signed on 15 September 1962.

Aram was also named as the minister of foreign affairs in the cabinet led by Prime Minister Hassan Ali Mansur on 7 March 1964. He remained in office until 1966 when Ardeshir Zahedi replaced him in the post.

Next Aram served as Iranian ambassador to the United Kingdom. He was appointed to the post in February 1967, replacing Ardeshir Zahedi. Aram's tenure ended in November 1969 when Amir Khosrow Afshar was appointed Iranian ambassador to the United Kingdom. In December 1973, Aram was appointed Iranian ambassador to China, becoming the first Iranian diplomat served in the post.

Views
In July 1960 in a press conference Shah Mohammad Reza Pahlavi expressed his positive attitude towards Israel which was harshly criticized by the Egyptian President Gamal Abdel Nasser. Following this incident both states expelled each other's ambassadors, and the Foreign Minister Aram stated that Gamal Abdel Nasser was a "light-headed pharaoh who is ruling by bloodshed". In the 1960s Aram was among the Iranian statesmen who favoured Iran's close relations with the U.S. and other Western countries in order to secure the survival of the Pahlavi dynasty.

Later years and death
Aram was arrested following the regime change in 1979, but released later. He died in 1985 and was buried in Behesht-e Zahra cemetery in Tehran.

References

External links

20th-century Iranian  diplomats
20th-century Iranian politicians
1906 births
1985 deaths
Ambassadors of Iran to China
Ambassadors of Iran to Iraq
Ambassadors of Iran to Japan
Ambassadors of Iran to the United Kingdom
Burials at Behesht-e Zahra
Foreign ministers of Iran
Grand Crosses with Star and Sash of the Order of Merit of the Federal Republic of Germany
Iran Novin Party politicians
Rastakhiz Party politicians
People of Pahlavi Iran
Cold War diplomats